Sp or SP may refer to:

Arts and entertainment
 /sp/, the sports board on the Internet forum 4chan
 SP (TV series), a Japanese TV series
 Game Boy Advance SP, an upgraded version of the Game Boy Advance handheld video game system, released in 2003
 Short Play, term used for shorter formats of records than Extended Play
 Standard Play, a magnetic tape speed used for VHS
 Subdominant parallel, a type of musical chord
 SP, producer stage name of Mumzy Stranger (born 1984), British rapper
 SP, stage name of Krisztián Éder (born 1988), Hungarian rapper
 South Park, an animated American television series
 The Smashing Pumpkins, an American alternative rock band

Businesses and organizations
 SP (magazine), illustrated news magazine in Spain between 1957 and 1972
 SP Technical Research Institute of Sweden
 Service provider, company that provides organizations with consulting, legal, real estate, education, communications, storage, processing, and many other services
 Silicon Power, Taiwan-based manufacturer of flash memory products and other industrial grade computer products
 Singapore Polytechnic, polytechnic in Dover, Singapore
 Státní podnik ("state business"), former Czechoslovakian entity type
 Story point, term used in agile software development methodologies
 Suara Pembaruan, former Indonesian newspaper

Government and military
 Section Patrol, civilian vessels in the US Navy in WWI
 Security Police (Japan), for VIP protection
 Shore patrol, UK and US naval security personnel

Political parties
 Centre Party (Norway) (Senterpartiet)
 Socialist Party or Social Democratic Party in many places, including:
 Socialist Party of Albania
 Samajwadi Party, in India
 Socialist Party (Netherlands) (Socialistische Partij)
 Socialistische Partij Anders (Socialistische Partij), a historical name for the sp.a in Belgium
 Socialist Party (Netherlands, interbellum) (Socialistische Partij) 1918–1929
 Social Democratic Party of Switzerland

Religious organizations
 Piarists or Ordo Clericorum Regularium pauperum Matris Dei Scholarum Piarum, a Catholic order
 Südtiroler Pfadfinderschaft, a Catholic scouting association in Italy

Places
 SP postcode area, UK, the Salisbury postcode area
 São Paulo (state), a state in Brazil
 São Paulo, capital of the state and the most populous city of Brazil

Science and technology
 sp orbitals, in physics, an instance of atomic orbital hybridisation
 Self-propelled (disambiguation)
 Soft-point bullet, a type of ammunition
 Spontaneous potential differences in the Earth
 Stated Preference, a choice modelling method
 Surface plasmon, a type of electron oscillation along metallic surfaces
 A Unified Soil Classification System symbol for sand, poorly graded

Biology and medicine
 Abbreviation for species
 Simulated patient, for medical training
 Substance P, a neuropeptide
 Status Post

Computing and telecommunications
 IBM Scalable POWERparallel (SP), a series of supercomputers
 Service pack, software update
 Stack pointer
 Stored procedure

Mathematics
 Trace (linear algebra), or "Spur" (German), of a square matrix
 Sp(n) and Sp(2n,F), a symplectic group in mathematics

Transportation
 SATA Air Acores (IATA code SP)
 Saidapet railway station (station code SP)
 Southern Pacific Railroad (reporting mark SP)

Other uses
 25 metre pistol , a shooting sport formerly known as sport pistol
 Aircraft registration prefix for Poland
 s.p., sine prole (Latin: "without issue" (i.e., having no children), full form d.s.p. decessit sine prole, "died without issue")
 Ś.P. Świętej pamięci meaning holy memory is written on many Polish gravestones
 Provincial road (Italy) (Strada Provinciale), a category of provincial roads in Italy
 September
 Seri Pahlawan Gagah Perkasa (S.P.), a Malaysian military decoration
 Spanish language
 Special (disambiguation)
 Spelling, especially to note a spelling error
 Spurius, the Roman praenomen; see Spurius (disambiguation)
 Suppressive Person, in Scientology
 Starting price, odds applicable on a horse race as the race is about to start
 Superintendent (police), a rank in British police services and in most English-speaking Commonwealth nations
 SP, an abbreviation for the Syrian pound

See also

 SPs
 SPS (disambiguation)